L.A. to Miami is the debut studio album by American country music singer Keith Whitley. It was released in October 1985 by RCA Records. The album includes the singles "I've Got the Heart for You," "Miami, My Amy," "Ten Feet Away," "Homecoming '63" and "Hard Livin'," all of which charted on Billboard Hot Country Singles (now Hot Country Songs) between 1985 and 1987. Also included are two songs that later became singles for other artists: "On the Other Hand" and "Nobody in His Right Mind Would've Left Her," which were Number Ones for Randy Travis and George Strait, respectively, in 1986. The latter was previously a No. 25 country hit for its writer, Dean Dillon, in 1980.

Critical reception

Al Campbell of Allmusic gave the album two stars out of five, saying that it "suffers as a whole from a lack of tempo change."

Track listing

Personnel
Adapted from liner notes.

Musicians
Carol Chase - background vocals
Sonny Garrish - steel guitar, Dobro
Mitch Humphries - keyboards
David Hungate - bass guitar
Jerry Kroon - drums
Larry Paxton - bass guitar
Don Potter - acoustic guitar
Gary Prim - keyboards
Brent Rowan - electric guitar, Dobro
Dennis Sollee - saxophone
Bobby Thompson - acoustic guitar
Chip Young - acoustic guitar
Curtis Young - background vocals

Technical
 Doug Crider - assistant engineer
 Bill Harris - engineering
 Randy Kling - mastering
 Blake Mevis - producer
 Ron Reynolds - engineering

Chart performance

References

1985 debut albums
Keith Whitley albums
RCA Records albums